"Changeling" is a song by English pop singer-songwriter Alison Moyet, and is the third single released off her eighth studio album, The Minutes (2013).

Background
Moyet offered "Changeling" as a free digital download via her web official site in February 2013 in order to give listeners a taste of what was to come from her upcoming album.

Changeling was under consideration as a possible album title. The idea was nixed once Moyet learned that singer Toyah Willcox had an album of the same name (The Changeling).

Critical reception
Upon release, Contactmusic.com said: ""Changeling" finds Alison's voice on strong and seductive form, with its powerful, experimental and dramatic style indicative of the boundary-pushing album as a whole." Digital Spy noted the song indicated that Moyet's "rich vocal still lends itself remarkably well to a swirling electronic paean".

In a review of The Minutes, AllMusic noted the song's "dubstep breakdowns and drops", while Record Collector highlighted its "investigating breakbeats". The Yorkshire Times described the song as having "exciting twists". PopMatters commented of the "synth line that points as precisely as the laser moving up between James Bond's legs." musicOMH said the song "leans towards mid-to-late Madonna, with its touches of R&B and full-blown synth-pop". However, they criticised the production and backing, saying "it's extremely overproduced, with [Moyet's] vocal sounding rather robotic and contained."

Track listing

"Changeling" — 2:57
"Right As Rain" (Guy Sigsworth Remix) — 3:17
"Right As Rain" (Terry Farley & Leo Zero Box Energy Vocal) — 7:25
"Right As Rain" (Terry Farley & Leo Zero Box Energy Dub) — 6:48

Music video
A lyric video was released months before The Minutes was released in February 2013. A music video for the single, directed by Cat Botibol, was released on 29 September 2013.

References

External links
 
 

2013 singles
Alison Moyet songs
Songs written by Guy Sigsworth
Songs written by Alison Moyet
Song recordings produced by Guy Sigsworth
2013 songs